Troup County High School, originally called Troup County Comprehensive High School, is a public college-preparatory and tech-preparatory school located in LaGrange, Georgia, United States. It is a member of the Troup County Board of Education, and is associated with Long Cane Middle School. Troup High School teaches grades 9-12.

Troup High School plan
The mission of Troup County High School is to provide a safe environment in which individuals are respected and have the opportunity to grow and to achieve success academically, socially, emotionally, physically, and aesthetically.

THS seeks to promote a lifelong desire to learn and to use wise decision-making skills that will enable students to meet the challenges of a rapidly changing society.

History
THS is a public high school, primarily serving the rural portions of western and southwestern Troup County. Center and Rosemont High Schools closed to form Troup High in 1956. The present facility was built in 1986.

Troup High meets accreditation standards for the state of Georgia as well as the Southern Association of Colleges and Schools. Students are enrolled in one of eight programs of study. Troup High serves 1,300 students, 98% of whom are in attendance each day. The school employs 92 certified personnel who have an average of 24.8 years of experience.

Athletics
In addition to the many teams available for student athletes, Troup High has an athletic complex with men's and women's locker areas and a newly equipped weight room for use by all athletes. Some Troup High graduates who have entered the professional athletic field give donations for the upkeep of said facilities.

The Tiger Den gymnasium provides students with a large gym for practice and competition. Inside the gym are practice areas for volleyball, cheerleading, basketball, and wrestling.

Troup High School won football Region Championships in 1972, 1986 and 1987. Troup High has produced many football standouts such as Mike Hart, Carl Whitfield, Tommy Cox, Tony Cox, Chris Burnette, Dino Stafford, Gary King, George Brewer and Charlie Flowers. Flowers returned to coach at Troup High years later. Former THS football player Donnie Laney said the 1986 team was and still is the greatest team in the history of the school.

Troup High also offers fields for baseball and softball competition, and a practice field for football and soccer. An indoor hitting facility will soon be completed near the baseball/softball fields for use by the softball and baseball teams.

Troup High School's wrestling team won nine state championships under the tutelage of Coach Dariel Daniel and finished Runner-up nine times as well as, finishing third three times. Troup wrestling has also produced eight USA Wrestling High School All-Americans. Coach Daniel left after the 2002 season and started coaching and teaching in Allen, Texas. He moved back to LaGrange after his retirement. Daniel died on November 19, 2013.

Troup High's football and soccer teams play at Callaway Stadium.

Fine arts

The Troup High Tiger Marching Band, also known as The Pride of Troup County, is currently under the direction of director Logan Huerta. Huerta is an alumnus of Troup High, and graduated from Auburn University. The band has been locally recognized many times. The marching band performs at all home and away football games, as well as the LaGrange and West Point Christmas Parades. The band has performed in the Washington D.C. Cherry Blossom Parade and the New York City Saint Patrick's Day Parade. Most band members take part in the symphonic band during the spring season.

Troup High is locally noted for the productions of its theater department. Under the direction of Noel Jordan, it has been hailed as professional and impressive. The usual theater season contains three shows, one of which is a musical. Actor Elijah Kelley is a product of the direction of the THS Drama Department.

The choral department, directed by Kathy Kirby, usually also gives three concerts, with the main attraction being the Spring Show.

All of these groups perform in the Fine Arts Auditorium, constructed in 2002, which can seat about 900. The local SPLOST funded this building.

Notable alumni
 Cory Grissom, professional football player
 Jimmy Haynes, former professional baseball player (Baltimore Orioles, Oakland Athletics, Milwaukee Brewers, Cincinnati Reds)
 Steve Herndon, former professional football player (Denver Broncos, Atlanta Falcons)
 Elijah Kelley, actor
 David Kelton, former professional baseball player (Chicago Cubs)
 Bubba Sparxxx, hip hop recording artist

References

Public high schools in Georgia (U.S. state)
Schools in Troup County, Georgia